Soyuz T-4 was a Soviet space mission which launched the crew of Salyut 6 EO-6, the sixth and final long-duration crew of the Salyut 6 space station. It was launched on 12 March 1981 and docked with the station the next day. During their stay, the EO-6 crew was visited by Soyuz 39 and Soyuz 40. Soyuz T-4 returned to Earth on 26 May 1981; its crew were the last to have inhabited Salyut 6.

Crew

Backup crew

Mission parameters
Mass: 6850 kg
Perigee: 201 km
Apogee: 250 km
Inclination: 51.6°
Period: 88.7 minutes

Mission highlights
The docking with Salyut 6 was delayed after the Soyuz's onboard Argon computer determined it would occur outside radio range with the TsUP. Despite this, the docking occurred successfully on 13 March 1981. The Progress 12 spacecraft was already docked to the station by the time the crew arrived, and they spent several days unloading the Progress before its undocking on 19 March. This freed the remaining docking port for the arrival of the Soyuz 39/EP-9 crew on 22 March.

In mid-May, Kovalyonok and Savinykh replaced the spacecraft's probe with a Salyut drogue. This may have been an experiment to see if a Soyuz-T docked to a space station could act as a rescue vehicle in the event that an approaching Soyuz-T equipped with a probe experienced docking difficulties and could not return to Earth.

The EO-6 crew undocked from Salyut 6 on 26 May, leaving behind the Soyuz's orbital module.

See also

List of human spaceflights to Salyut space stations
List of Salyut expeditions

References

Crewed Soyuz missions
Spacecraft launched in 1981
1981 in the Soviet Union
Spacecraft which reentered in 1981